The Women's 50m Breaststroke at the 2007 World Aquatics Championships took place on 31 March (prelims & semifinals) and the evening of 1 April (finals) at the Rod Laver Arena in Melbourne, Australia. 86 swimmers were entered in the event, of which 74 swam.

Existing records at the start of the event were:
World Record (WR):  30.31, Jade Edmistone (Australia), 30 January 2006 in Melbourne, Australia.
Championship Record (CR): 30.45, Jade Edmistone (Australia), Montreal 2005 (31 July 2005)

Results

Finals

Semifinals

Preliminaries

References

Women's 50m Breaststroke Preliminary results from the 2007 World Championships. Published by OmegaTiming.com (official timer of the '07 Worlds); Retrieved 2009-07-11.
Women's 50m Breaststroke Semifinals results from the 2007 World Championships. Published by OmegaTiming.com (official timer of the '07 Worlds); Retrieved 2009-07-11.
Women's 50m Breaststroke Final results from the 2007 World Championships. Published by OmegaTiming.com (official timer of the '07 Worlds); Retrieved 2009-07-11.

Swimming at the 2007 World Aquatics Championships
2007 in women's swimming